St John the Evangelist's Church is in the village of Alvanley, Cheshire, England.  It is an active Anglican parish church in the diocese of Chester, the archdeaconry of Chester and the deanery of Frodsham.  Its benefice is united with that of St John the Evangelist, Manley.  The church is recorded in the National Heritage List for England as a designated Grade II listed building.  It is described by the authors of the Buildings of England series as "a building of some character".

History

The church was built in 1860 to a design by J. S. Crowther at the expense of Catherine Emma Arden, the youngest daughter of Richard Arden, 1st Baron Alvanley.

Architecture

Exterior
The church is built in red sandstone with gabled grey slate roofs in early Decorated style.  Its plan consists of four-bay nave with north and south aisles under separate roofs, and a chancel with a north vestry. On the west end is a corbelled belfry with small steeple containing two bells.  The windows contain either Geometric tracery, or Y-tracery.  The gables have ornate cross finials.

Interior
The arcades are carried on circular piers.  The stained glass dates from the early 20th century, and is probably by Shrigley and Hunt.  Also in the church is a wooden board giving the list of curates since 1677, and vicars since 1861.

External features

In the churchyard are two tombs which are listed at Grade II, and the war graves of a British and a Canadian soldier of World War I.

See also

Listed buildings in Alvanley
List of works by J. S. Crowther

References

Alvanley, St John the Evangelist's Church
Alvanley, St John the Evangelist's Church
Churches completed in 1860
19th-century Church of England church buildings
Gothic Revival church buildings in England
Alvanley, St John the Evangelist's Church
Alvanley, St John the Evangelist's Church